Ivan Mišković (born April 9, 1984) is a Serbian professional basketball player for Koopspor Nicosia of the North Cyprus Basketball League. He played college basketball for the Alaska Nanooks.

College statistics

|-
| align="left" | 2002–03
| align="left" | Alaska Fairbanks
| 2 || 0 || 1.0 || .000 || .000 || .000 || 0.5 || 0.0 || 0.0 || 0.0 || 0.0
|-
| align="left" | 2003–04
| align="left" | Alaska Fairbanks
| 4 || 0 || 24.7 || .409 || .000 || .571 || 6.3 || 1.00 || 0.0 || 0.7 || 7.3
|-
| align="left" | 2004–05
| align="left" | Alaska Fairbanks
| 3 || 0 || 19.3 || .471 || .000 || .571 || 3.3 || 0.3 || 0.7 || 0.7 || 6.7
|-
| align="left" | 2005–06
| align="left" | Alaska Fairbanks
| 3 || 0 || 17.0 || .571 || .000 || .526 || 3.7 || 0.7 || 0.7 || 1.3 || 8.7

References

External links
 Final 4 Management
 
 
 
 
 
 

1984 births
Living people
Alaska Nanooks men's basketball players
Arkadikos B.C. players
Basketball players from Belgrade
KK Spartak Subotica players
Macedonian men's basketball players
Macedonian people of Serbian descent
OKK Beograd players
Power forwards (basketball)
Serbian men's basketball players
Serbian expatriate basketball people in Bosnia and Herzegovina
Serbian expatriate basketball people in Denmark
Serbian expatriate basketball people in Greece
Serbian expatriate basketball people in France
Serbian expatriate basketball people in Hungary
Serbian expatriate basketball people in Romania
Serbian expatriate basketball people in Slovenia
Serbian expatriate basketball people in North Macedonia
Serbian expatriate basketball people in the United States